Tony Lopez may refer to:

 Tony Lopez (poet) (born 1950), English poet
 Tony Lopez (boxer) (born 1963), former boxer
Tony Lopez (born 1999), social media personality

See also
Antony Lopez (disambiguation)
Antonio Lopez (disambiguation)